Jat Airways AVIO taxi (Serbian Cyrillic: Јат Ервејз АВИО такси) was a taxi airline company in Serbia with bases at Belgrade Nikola Tesla Airport and Vršac Airport. It was one of the three air taxi companies after Prince Aviation and Air Pink. Jat Airways AVIO Taxi was a subsidiary of the national air carrier of Serbia, Jat Airways.

History
The Jat Airways AVIO Taxi Company was formed in 2002. It transported passengers from Belgrade and Vršac to European destinations, and a few destinations in North Africa.

In 2004, the airline started operating scenic tours for tourists flying around Belgrade city center.

Fleet
The Jat Airways AVIO taxi fleet consisted of the following:

 15 Cessna 172
 2 Cessna 152 Aerobat
 2 Cessna 310T
 2 Piper PA-31T Cheyenne

When the aircraft were not being hired for air taxi service they were often used for training by young pilots.

See also
 Jat Airways
 List of defunct airlines in Serbia

External links
 

Airlines established in 2002
Airlines disestablished in 2013
Defunct airlines of Serbia
Jat Airways
Serbian companies established in 2002